RK Vogošća Poljine Hills is a Bosnian handball team located in Vogošća. Their home matches are played at Sportska Dvorana Amel Bečković. They compete in Handball Championship of Bosnia and Herzegovina where their best result is 2nd in 2015-16.

Honours
Handball Championship of Bosnia and Herzegovina:
Runner-Up (2): 2016, 2018

European record

Team

Current squad 
Squad for the 2016–17 season

Goalkeepers
 Ismar Hadžić
 Mirza Haseljić 
 Adnan Šabanović

Wingers
RW
  Anes Bečić 
  Adi Džinović
  Medin Šestan
LW 
  Ibro Jelačić
  Amer Karamehmedović
  Ajdin Smajilbegović
  Faruk Špiljak
Line players 
  Tarik Dedajić
  Alen Geko
  Nedim Kadrić 

Back players
LB
  Ivan Divković
  Ammar Kadrić
  Zlatko Kreso
  Spasoje Pekić
  Adnan Tufekčić
  Adis Hrbat
CB 
  Haris Đapo
  Tarik Međić 
RB
  Sakib Imširović
  Samir Korjenić
  Stanko Stanković

Recent seasons

The recent season-by-season performance of the club:

Notable players 
 Faruk Vražalić
 Alen Ovčina

References

External links

Vogošća
Bosnia and Herzegovina handball clubs